The 1971 Campionati Internazionali di Sicilia, also known as the Palermo Open, was a men's tennis tournament played on outdoor clay courts in Palermo, Italy that was part of the Group C category of the 1971 Grand Prix circuit. It was the 23rd edition of the tournament and was held from 12 April until 18 April 1971. Roger Taylor won the singles title.

Finals

Singles
 Roger Taylor defeated  Pierre Barthès 6–3, 4–6, 7–6, 6–2

Doubles
 Georges Goven /  Pierre Barthès defeated  Ilie Năstase /  Ion Țiriac 6–2, 6–3

References

External links
 ITF tournament edition details

Campionati Internazionali di Sicilia
Campionati Internazionali di Sicilia
Campionati Internazionali di Sicilia